Wayne Zuk (born October 29, 1949) is a Canadian former professional ice hockey player. During the 1973–74 season, Zuk played 2 games in the World Hockey Association with the Alberta Oilers.

Zuk also played in the International Hockey League, having stints with the Toledo Blades, Flint Generals, and the Saginaw Gears and the Southern Hockey League, playing with the Greensboro Generals during the 1974-75 season. He won the Gary F. Longman Memorial Trophy as the IHL's most outstanding first year player as voted on by the league's coaches following the 1969-70 season.

References

External links

1949 births
Living people
Canadian ice hockey centres
Edmonton Oilers (WHA) players
Flint Generals players
Greensboro Generals (SHL) players
Saginaw Gears players
Toledo Blades players